Ha-meem Group is  one of the largest Bangladeshi conglomerates in textile and garments sector. It owns 26 garments factories, sweater factory, poly bag industry, label factory, jute mill, chemical formulation plant, tea estates, transport company, Channel 24 and Samakal, a widely circulated national daily newspaper. The newspaper are under Times Media Limited of Ha-meem Group. It employs 50 thousand people.

A. K. Azad is the chairman, Chief Executive Officer, and managing director of the group. Colonel (retired) Md. Delwar Hossain is the deputy managing director of the group.

History 
Ha-meem Group was established in 1984 by A. K. Azad and Md. Delwar Hossain with a single garment factory.

Garment workers vandalized their factory in Ashulia after which the group filed a case against 1600 unidentified people in 2009. The group denied the workers were from their own factory. The protests started after 1000 garment workers in an unrelated factory were fired. The group chairman, A. K. Azad, filed police case requesting security from Bashundhara Group after Samakal wrote news articles against the Bashundhara Group.

On 14 December 2010, 26 workers died in a fire at Thats it Sportswear, a Ha-meem Group factory, in Ashulia and 100 were injured. The fire exit and gate of the factory were locked which increased the death toll.

In June 2012, labour unrest broke out at the subsidiary of the group, Artistic Design Limited, in Ashulia.

Labour unrests in the group's factories in Ashulia stopped production as workers went on strike demanding increase in salary in May 2013. About 80 per cent of the group's export went to the United States.

In December 2016, the group terminated 368 workers over labour unrest.

Ha-meem Group invested 60 million USD to expand Denim production in 2017. Bangladesh Bank rejected a proposal by Ha-meem group to invest 10 million USD in Haiti to export to the United States. That's It Fashions Limited announced plans to buy 11 million shares of Pubali Bank. Ha-meem Group invested in tea plantations.

On 21 March 2018, the house of the group's chairman, A. K. Azad, was demolished in Gulshan by the Rajdhani Unnayan Kartripakkha, led by director Aliur Rahman, for not having an approved design. Ha-meem group claimed the demolition took place despite them showing legal documents and stopped after it was shown to the chairman of Rajdhani Unnayan Kartripakkha. Anti Corruption Commission summoned Azad on the same day as the demolition.  Azad is the senior Vice-President of Faridpur District unit of Awami League and director of Shahjalal Islami Bank.

In April 2020, workers of Sharmin Group and Ha-meem Group participated in violent labour protests.

A worker of the group was seriously injured in police firing at a workers protest. The workers of That's It Garments Limited and Creative Collections Limited were protesting when the police shot them on 10 May 2021.

In April 2022, Ha-meem Group announced plans to increase garment export from 580 million USD to one billion USD per year by 2024. It sold 200 million USD worth of garment products in the Bangladeshi market. Refat Garments Limited is the biggest exporting unit of the group with exports worth 172 million USD in 2017-2018 fiscal year alone.

Subsidiaries 
 Artistic Design Limited
 Ha-Meem Apparels Limited
 That’s It Garments Limited
 That’s It Sports Wear Limited
 Apparels Gallery Limited
 Refat Garments Limited
 Creative Collections Limited
 Next Collections Limited
 Ha-Meem Design Limited
 Refat Packaging & Printing Industries Limited
 That’s It Knit Limited
 That's It Sweater Limited
 Modern Washing Plant
 Sajid Washing Plant
 Creative Washing Plant
 Express Washing Plant
 Ha-Meem Denim Mills Limited
 Ha-Meem label
 Ha-Meem Design Studio
 Embroidery Factory
 Printing Factory
 Carton Factory
 Poly Bag Industry
 Label Factory
 M. H. Jute Mills Limited
 Chemical Formulation Plant
 Channel 24
 Samakal

See also
 List of companies of Bangladesh

References

External links

 Ha-meem Group corporate information

Companies based in Dhaka
Conglomerate companies of Bangladesh
1984 establishments in Bangladesh